1793 in sports describes the year's events in world sport.

Boxing
Events
 "Big Ben" Brain retained his English Championship title, but illness meant that he could not fight again.

Cricket
Events
 Surrey teams defeated All-England three times.
England
 Most runs – Tom Walker 496 (HS 138) 
 Most wickets – Thomas Boxall 44

Horse racing
England
 The Derby – Waxy
 The Oaks – Caelia
 St Leger Stakes – Ninety-three

References

 
1793